Meagan A. Flynn (born July 28, 1967) is an American judge who is the chief justice of the Oregon Supreme Court. She previously served as a judge on the Oregon Court of Appeals from 2014 to 2017. Flynn was appointed to the state’s supreme court by the Governor Kate Brown in March 2017.

Education
Flynn graduated high school from the Holy Names Academy in Seattle in 1985. She completed a bachelor's degree at Willamette University in 1989, and a J.D. degree at Gonzaga University School of Law in 1992. Flynn clerked for the Oregon Court of Appeals in 1992–1994, for judges Robert D. Durham and Rick Haselton.

Legal career
Flynn worked as an attorney in private practice in Portland, Oregon, specializing in torts, employment, and insurance law. She was an associate at Pozzi Wilson Atchison from 1994 to 1999, and was a partner at Preston Bunnell & Flynn from 1999 to 2014.

Flynn specialized in appellate advocacy before Oregon’s appellate courts and the U.S. Court of Appeals for the Ninth Circuit. She also served on the executive committee of the Oregon Law Institute and chaired the Oregon State Bar Appellate Practice Section.

Judicial career
Governor John Kitzhaber announced the appointment of Meagan Flynn as a state judge on the Oregon Court of Appeals, Position 7, on September 25, 2014. She succeeded Robert Wollheim, who retired from the court on October 31, 2014. Flynn was re-elected to the appeals court in November 2016.

Governor Kate Brown appointed Flynn to the Oregon Supreme Court in 2017, to replace justice Richard C. Baldwin, who retired on March 31, 2017. Justice Flynn’s term ends in January 2019, and she is eligible to run for re-election in November 2018, for a new six-year term. Flynn became chief justice on December 31, 2022, after Martha Lee Walters retired.

References

|-

1967 births
21st-century American judges
21st-century American women judges
Chief Justices of the Oregon Supreme Court
Gonzaga University School of Law alumni
Justices of the Oregon Supreme Court
Living people
Oregon Court of Appeals judges
Oregon lawyers
Politicians from Seattle
Willamette University alumni
Women chief justices of state supreme courts in the United States